The Paraguay national under-23 football team, also known as the Paraguay Olympic football team, represents Paraguay in international football competitions in Olympic Games and Pan American Games. The team is controlled by the Paraguayan Football Association and is limited to players under the age of 23, except three overage players, ostensibly possessing veteran experience, in accordance with FIFA regulations.

Competitive record

Olympic Games

CONMEBOL Pre-Olympic Tournament

Pan American Games

Honours
Summer Olympics:
  Silver medalists (1): 2004
 CONMEBOL Pre-Olympic Tournament
 Champions (1): 1992
 Runners-up (1): 2004
 Third place (1): 1984
 South American Games:
  Gold medalists (1): 1978

Results and fixtures

2019

2020

Players

Current squad
The following players were called up to compete in the 2020 CONMEBOL Pre-Olympic Tournament.

Head coach:  Ernesto Marcucci

The 23-man squad was announced on 27 December 2019. On 3 January 2020, Sergio Bareiro was called up to replace Sebastián Ferreira who was not released by his team Monarcas Morelia.

Notable players 
 Carlos Gamarra
 José Saturnino Cardozo
 Édgar Barreto

Overage players in Olympic Games

Former squads
 1992 Summer Olympics squads - Paraguay
 2004 CONMEBOL Men Pre-Olympic Tournament squads - Paraguay
 2004 Summer Olympics squads - Paraguay

See also
 Paraguay national football team
 Paraguay national under-20 football team
 Paraguay national under-17 football team

References

External links

under-23
South American national under-23 association football teams